Great Australian Bight Marine Park (formerly Great Australian Bight Commonwealth Marine Reserve) is a marine protected area located in the Great Australian Bight south of South Australia in waters within the Australian Exclusive economic zone.  

It was gazetted in November 2012 to replace the Great Australian Bight Marine Park (Commonwealth waters).  It was renamed on 11 October 2017.

The purpose of the marine park is to protect habitat used for calving by the Southern right whale and as a feeding area for the following species - Australian sea lion, sperm whale, short-tailed shearwater and great white shark.  

It is part of a group of Australian marine parks known as the South-west Marine Parks Network.  It is also part of the group of marine protected areas which are located together in waters within Australian and South Australian jurisdictions within the Great Australian Bight and which were collectively known as the Great Australian Bight Marine Park as recently as 2005.

It lies to the west of the Western Eyre Marine Park.

See also
 Protected areas of Australia

Citations and references
Citations

References

External links
Official webpage
Webpage for the Great Australian Bight Commonwealth Marine Reserve on the Protected Planet website

IUCN Category II
IUCN Category VI
Australian marine parks
Protected areas established in 2012
2012 establishments in Australia
Great Australian Bight